"Lemon Pie" is a song by English band Strawbs featured on their 1974  album Ghosts.

Lyrical and musical content

The song was written by Dave Cousins and was the second single to be released off the album. It was written about and for Cousins's girlfriend at the time, who later became his wife.

Release history

B-Side of the single

The B-side track "Don't Try to Change Me" is a Dave Lambert composition, also appearing on the album.

The B-side of the 1975 United States release is "Where Do You Go (When You Need a Hole to Crawl In)", another Dave Cousins composition.

Personnel

Dave Cousins – lead vocals, acoustic guitar
Dave Lambert – electric guitar, backing vocals
Chas Cronk – bass guitar, backing vocals
John Hawken – harpsichord, synthesizer, piano
Rod Coombes – drums

References
"Lemon Pie" at Strawbsweb
Liner notes to A&M CD 540 937-2 Ghosts

External links
Lyrics to "Lemon Pie" at Strawbsweb
Lyrics to "Don't Try to Change Me" at Strawbsweb
Lyrics to "Where Do You Go" at Strawbsweb

1975 singles
Strawbs songs
1975 songs
Songs written by Dave Cousins